Charles Murray Floyd, OBE, FLS, FRICS (12 September 1905 – 27 June 1971) was an English businessman, surveyor, land agent and local politician.

Biography 
Charles Murray Floyd was born on 12 September 1905, the third and youngest son of Captain Sir Henry Robert Peel Floyd, 4th Baronet (1855–1915), a Royal Naval officer who fought in the East African Campaign of 1890 and the Second Boer War, and his wife Edith Anne Kincaid-Smith (died 1955), daughter of Major John Kincaid-Smith, of Polmont House, Stirlingshire, Scotland; the elder sons were Brigadier Sir Henry Robert Kincaid Floyd, who became 5th Baronet, and Sir John Duckett Floyd, who succeeded him as 6th baronet.

Charles Floyd was educated at Eton College and Trinity College, Cambridge, graduating with a Bachelor of Arts (BA) degree in 1927. He was a partner in the surveyors and land agents company Powlett & Floyd of Bath from 1935 to 1955 and a Fellow of the Royal Institution of Chartered Surveyors, but his career was interrupted by service in the Second World War; he joined the British Expeditionary Force in France in 1939 and served with them until 1940; he was later attached to the 21st Army Group in the last two years of the war, rising to the rank of Lieutenant-Colonel and being appointed an Officer of the Order of the British Empire (OBE). In 1955 he became chairman of two firms, Avon Rubber Company Ltd and George Spencer Morton Ltd; he retired from those posts in 1968. Floyd was also keenly involved with land management groups; he was a member of the Forestry Commission's Committee for England from 1954 and was President of the Royal Forestry Society of England and Wales from 1954 to 1956; he was also a member of the Royal Commission on Common Land from 1955 to 1958 and a Fellow of the Linnean Society of London. He was Sheriff of Wiltshire for 1962–63 and councillor on Wiltshire County Council from 1965 till his death on 27 June 1971.

In 1948, Floyd married Mary Elizabeth Fleetwood Fuller, OBE, JP, DL (1916–1996), the daughter of Major Robert Fleetwood Fuller (1875–1955), JP, DL, of Great Chalfield, Melksham, Wiltshire (of which county he was High Sheriff in 1926), and the widow of Lieutenant-Colonel Patrick John Salvin Boyle (1910–1944). Floyd and his wife had three children: Robert Charles (born 1949), Thomas Henry Floyd (born 1951) and William Duckett (born 1956); his step-son is Sir Simon Boyle.

References 

1905 births
1971 deaths
Alumni of Trinity College, Cambridge
20th-century British businesspeople
British surveyors
Fellows of the Linnean Society of London
Fellows of the Royal Institution of Chartered Surveyors
Members of Wiltshire County Council
Officers of the Order of the British Empire
People educated at Eton College
Younger sons of baronets